, also spelled kompeitō, is a type of Japanese sugar candy. It takes the form of a small sphere with a bumpy surface, and comes in a variety of colors and flavors.

Etymology
The word  comes from the Portuguese word  (comfit), which is a type of sugar candy.

The characters  (lit.

History 
The technique for producing sugar candy was introduced to Japan in the early 16th century by Portuguese traders. The infrastructure and refining technology of sugar had not yet been established in Japan. As  uses a lot of sugar, it was very rare and expensive as a result.

By the Meiji period,  had already been culturally prescribed as one of the standards of Japanese sweets—the character Sugar Plum Fairy in The Nutcracker was translated into  ("Fairy of ").

Production
Konpeitō is usually  in diameter and is produced by repeatedly coating a sugar syrup over a core consisting of a grain of coarse sugar. Originally, the core was a poppy seed. The process is somewhat similar to the dragée process, except the candies are produced by being ladled with sugar syrup and rotated slowly in a large heated gong-shaped tub (dora). Each grain of the core sugar grows over the course of several days with the continued rotating, heating, and application of syrup, becoming a ball covered with tiny bulges. It usually takes 7–13 days to make konpeitō and they are still crafted by artisans today.

Other uses 

The Japanese Ministry of Defense's Emergency Food Ration tins and the Japan Ground Self-Defense Force's Combat Ration tins both contain konpeito candies, in addition to hard tack bread/biscuits and other food items. While the candies aid in the calorie content necessary for activities, it also helps promote the creation of saliva to make it easier to eat the dry bread. According to the Ministry of Defense's specifications, "Each white emergency ration bag will contain 150g of small dry bread, with 8 whites, 3 reds, 2 yellows, 2 greens as standard, amounting to 15g or more to be put in the bag.” It is thought that providing the 'colorful and enjoyable' Konpeito will also reduce the stress that would be experienced at times during a disaster.

Konpeito is often used for celebrations such as marriage and childbirth, in elaborate candy boxes called bonbonniere, from the French , meaning candy box. It is given as a gift for prayers at shrines and temples. The practice of giving bonbonniere dates back to the commemoration ceremony of the Meiji Constitution in 1889 and has since been thought to be a symbol of good luck. The Japanese Imperial Family has used these Onshino Konpeitō as the official ‘Welcome’ gift continuously for over 130 years.

In popular culture 
The Star Bits in Super Mario Galaxy and its sequel, the Gratitude Crystals and Star Fragments in The Legend of Zelda series, the Star Fragments in Animal Crossing as well as Minior, Max Revives (and to a lesser extent, Revives), Cosmog's star candies from the Pokémon series, and EXP Star Jellies in Cookie Run: Kingdom are all based on these candies. The susuwatari from Studio Ghibli films such as Spirited Away are also shown to eat konpeitō. Super Mario RPG also features it as an attack item that was localized as "Rock Candy". The candies are a prominent icon in the anime series Stellvia, and are also featured in an episode of the children's anime Hamtaro, referred to as "diamonds of sugar" in the English dub.

See also
Japanese words from Portuguese
Rock candy
Wagashi

References

Wagashi
Candy
Japanese snack food